Potpourri is a mixture of dried, naturally fragrant plant materials used to provide a gentle natural scent, commonly in residential settings. It is often placed in a decorative bowl.

The word "potpourri" comes into English from the French word . The French term has two connotations. It is the French name for a Spanish stew with a wide variety of ingredients called , a specialty of the city of Burgos. The word  in French has the same meaning as it does in English (and as  does in Spanish), while the word , like Spanish , means "rotten".

History 
 Potpourri has been used in rooms since ancient times, in a variety of ways, including just scattering it on the floor. In early 17th-century France, fresh herbs and flowers were gathered—beginning in spring and continuing throughout the summer. The herbs were left for a day or two to become limp, then layered with coarse sea salt. The aging mixture was stirred occasionally as layers were added to it. Often the mixture would ferment or even mold as the summer went by. In fall, spices would be added to the unsightly grey mix until a pleasant fragrance was achieved. Then, scent preserving fixatives (see below) were added. The finished potpourri was set out in special pots with perforated lids to perfume rooms.

Much modern potpourri consists of any decoratively shaped dried plant material (not necessarily from scented plants) with strong natural and synthetic perfumes (and often colored dyes) added, with the scent often bearing no relation to the plant material used. Sometimes, items that do not originate from plants are mixed in with the potpourri, to give it bulk and to make it more aesthetically pleasing. It is possible to spray scents onto potpourri, however, a fixative is needed so that the scent is absorbed for slow release. Generally, orris root is used for this purpose.

Lifespan

Dried flowers can last anywhere from two months to 20 years, depending on the chosen blend. Properly made potpourri will last longer when stored in closed containers.

Containers
In ceramics manufacturing, a potpourri vase is specifically designed for holding potpourri. In the traditional designs, a potpourri container is provided with a pierced fitted lid, through which the scent may slowly diffuse.  The porcelain Sèvres pot-pourri vase in the shape of a ship is one of the most spectacular examples from the 1750s and 1760s; Madame de Pompadour owned three of the twelve examples made, ten of which survived.

Plants used

Many plant species are used in potpourri. A 2015 study from the Royal Botanic Gardens, Kew identified 455 species used in potpourri from over 100 families, including algae, fungi, and lichens. A few toxic ingredients have been found in fruits such as Strychnos nux-vomica, the strychnine tree.  Plant materials used in potpourri include:

 Allspice
 Cedar wood shavings (toxic, a moth repellent)
 Cinnamon bark and cassia bark, which smells like cinnamon, only less potent
 Cloves
 Cypress wood shavings (toxic, another moth repellent)
 Fennel seed
 Incense-cedar wood shavings
 Jasmine flowers and oil
 Jujube flowers and blooms
 Juniper wood shavings (toxic, a moth repellent)
 Lavender leaves and flowers
 Lemon balm leaves and flowers
 Lemon peel
 Marjoram leaves and flowers
 Mignonette leaves and flowers
 Mint leaves and flowers
 Mugwort (toxic, adds a musky note to the mix, another moth repellent)
 Orange peel
 Pelargonium leaves from the scented varieties
 Pinyon pine shavings and cones 
 Rose flowers, hips, or oil
 Rosemary leaves and flowers

Alternative meaning
Potpourri is sometimes used as  an alternative for medley.

References

Perfumery